The men's 100 metres event at the 1970 Summer Universiade was held at the Stadio Comunale in Turin on 2 and 3 September 1970.

Medalists

Results

Heats
Held on 2 September

Wind:Heat 5: +1.5 m/s, Heat 6: 0.0 m/s, Heat 7: +0.5 m/s

Semifinals
Held on 3 September

Wind:Heat 1: +1.8 m/s, Heat 2: +1.2 m/s, Heat 3: ? m/s

Final
Held on 3 September

Wind: 0.0 m/s

References

Athletics at the 1970 Summer Universiade
1970